A Chronicle of England During the Reigns of the Tudors, From A.D. 1485 to 1559, better known as Wriothesley's Chronicle, was written during the reigns of Henry VIII, Edward VI, Mary I and Elizabeth I, by Charles Wriothesley, officer of arms at the College of Arms in London.

References

Sources

External links

 A Chronicle of England During the Reigns of the Tudors, From A.D. 1485 to 1559, I Wriothesley's Chronicle, Volume I at Internet Archive
 A Chronicle of England During the Reigns of the Tudors, From A.D. 1485 to 1559, II Wriothesley's Chronicle, Volume II at Internet Archive

English chronicles
Tudor England